1963 in the Philippines details events of note that happened in the Philippines in the year 1963.

Incumbents

 President: Diosdado Macapagal (Liberal) 
 Vice President: Emmanuel Pelaez (Liberal) 
 Chief Justice: César Bengzon 
 Congress: 5th

Events

April
 April 5 – Ferdinand Marcos became President of the Senate of the Philippines.

July
 July 20 – Lalaine Bennett won 3rd Runner up of Miss Universe 1963 at Miami Beach, Florida, US. She is the first Filipina to Runner-up at Miss Universe.
 July 28 – Twenty-four Filipino boy scouts and scout officials en route to Athens, Greece for the 11th World Jamboree were among the total of 60 people perished when the United Arab Airlines Flight 869 crashed into the Arabian Sea a few miles off Bombay, India.

August
 August 8 – President Diosdado Macapagal signed the Agricultural Land Reform Code.

Holidays

As per Act No. 2711 section 29, issued on March 10, 1917, if any legal holiday of fixed date falls on Sunday, the next succeeding day shall be observed as legal holiday. Sundays are also considered legal religious holidays. Bonifacio Day was added through Philippine Legislature Act No. 2946. It was signed by then-Governor General Francis Burton Harrison in 1921. On October 28, 1931, the Act No. 3827 was approved declaring the last Sunday of August as National Heroes Day. As per Republic Act No. 3022, April 9th is proclaimed as Bataan Day.

 January 1 – New Year's Day
 February 22 – Legal Holiday
 April 9 – Bataan Day 
 April 11 – Maundy Thursday
 April 12 – Good Friday
 May 1 – Labor Day
 July 4 – Independence Day
 August 13  – Legal Holiday
 August 25  – National Heroes Day
 November 28 – Thanksgiving Day
 November 30 – Bonifacio Day
 December 25 – Christmas Day
 December 30 – Rizal Day

Births
 February 5 – Franz Pumaren, basketball player and coach
 February 17 – Jinggoy Estrada, Filipino actor and politician
 April 1 – Teddy Diaz, founding member, guitar player of The Dawn (d. 1988)
 April 2 – Teddy Alfarero, basketball player (d. 2004)
 April 25 – Boyet Sison, Filipino journalist and sports commentator (d. 2022)
 May 12 – Cherie Gil, Filipino actress (d. 2022)
 June 15 – Allan Caidic, basketball player
 August 1 – Ato Agustin, basketball player and coach
 August 11 – Bobby Nalzaro, Filipino radio and television journalist (d. 2022)
 August 14 – Edwin Olivarez, Filipino athlete, politician and businessman
 August 24 – Francis Pangilinan, Filipino lawyer and politician
 August 28 – Gerry Ortega, RMN radio commentator and human activist (d. 2011)
 October 2 – Maria Ressa, journalist
 October 3 – Marion Peck, Painter
 October 5 – E.R. Ejercito, actor and politician
 October 15 – Maria Teresa Carlson, actress (d. 2002)
 October 16 – Gilberto Duavit Jr., Filipino businessman (president of GMA Network)
 October 25 – Grace Padaca, Filipino politician and broadcaster
 November 6 – Arthur B. Robes, Filipino politician.
 November 14 – Martin Romualdez, Filipino businessman, lawyer, and politician (Speaker of the House of Representatives)
 December 18 – Yves Dignadice, Basketball player

Dates Unknown
Benjamin Abadiano, Filipino lexicographer

Deaths
 March 7 – Jaime C. de Veyra, Filipino academic (b. 1873)
 April 11 – Teofisto Guingona, Sr., father of former Vice President Teofisto Guingona, Jr.(b. 1883)
 April 12 – Felix Manalo, 76, founder and first Executive Minister of Iglesia ni Cristo. (b. 1886)
 May 1 – Lope K. Santos, Filipino novelist. (b. 1879)
 September 13 – Frances E. Parrette (b. August 17, 1907)
 December 15 – Sotero Cabahug, lawyer, legislator, and politician (b. 1891)

Deaths Unknown
 Regino Ylanan, Filipino sports administrator, writer and athlete.(born 1889)

References